Interstate 695 (I-695) is an auxiliary Interstate Highway in the New York City borough of the Bronx. It serves as a connector between I-95 (Bruckner Expressway) and I-295 (Cross Bronx Expressway) near the Throgs Neck Bridge toward Queens and Long Island. I-695 is named the Throgs Neck Expressway.

Route description
I-695 begins at exit 10 on the Cross Bronx Expressway Extension (I-295) in the Throggs Neck section of the Bronx. The highway heads to the northwest, passing through the western fringe of Weir Creek Park before descending into a cut and proceeding into Throggs Neck. Here, it connects to Randall Avenue (southbound) and Lafayette Avenue (northbound) as it makes its way northward. I-695 continues to the northern edge of the neighborhood, where it merges into the Bruckner Expressway (I-95) at its exit 7A.

History
The Throgs Neck Expressway was completed in 1961 at a cost of $16 million (equivalent to $ in ), connecting the Throgs Neck Bridge to the Bruckner Expressway. For years, the highway was considered (and signed as) a spur of I-78, which initially followed all of modern I-295 from the Bruckner Interchange to Hillside Avenue (now New York State Route 25). When this section of I-78 was renumbered to I-295 on January 1, 1970, the Throgs Neck Expressway became a spur of that route. In 1986, the New York State Department of Transportation resigned the Throgs Neck Expressway as I-695 to avoid driver confusion with the Cross Bronx Expressway Extension, also signed as I-295. The Federal Highway Administration formally recognized I-695 on April 7, 2008, and the number was approved by the American Association of State Highway and Transportation Officials on May 6, 2008.

Exit list
The entire route is in the Throggs Neck neighborhood of the New York City borough of the Bronx.

See also

References

External links

I-695 (Greater New York Roads)

95-6 New York
95-6
6 New York
Expressways in New York City
Transportation in the Bronx
1961 establishments in New York City